Neurogastroenterology & Motility is a bimonthly peer-reviewed medical journal covering neurogastroenterology and gastrointestinal motility. It was established in 1989 as the Journal of Gastrointestinal Motility, obtaining its current name in 1994, and is published by Wiley-Blackwell. It is the official journal of the European Society of Neurogastroenterology and Motility, as well as the American Neurogastroenterology and Motility Society. The editors-in-chief are Gianrico Farrugia (Mayo Clinic), Magnus Simren (Sahlgrenska University Hospital), and Gary Mawe (University of Vermont).

Abstracting and indexing
The journal is abstracted and indexed in:
 Academic Search
 CAS: Chemical Abstracts Service
 CSA Biological Sciences Database
 Current Contents/Clinical Medicine
 Embase
 Index Medicus/MEDLINE/PubMed
 Neurosciences Abstracts
 Science Citation Index
According to the Journal Citation Reports, the journal has a 2013 impact factor of 3.424.

References

External links

Gastroenterology and hepatology journals
Bimonthly journals
Publications established in 1989
Wiley-Blackwell academic journals
English-language journals